At Tahrir District is a district of the Amanat Al Asimah Governorate, Yemen. As of 2003, the district had a population of 66,898 inhabitants.

References

Districts of Amanat Al Asimah Governorate